Amyl nitrite is a chemical compound with the formula C5H11ONO. A variety of isomers are known, but they all feature an amyl group attached to the nitrite functional group. The alkyl group is unreactive and the chemical and biological properties are mainly due to the nitrite group. Like other alkyl nitrites, amyl nitrite is bioactive in mammals, being a vasodilator, which is the basis of its use as a prescription medicine. As an inhalant, it also has a psychoactive effect, which has led to its recreational use, with its smell being described as that of old socks or dirty feet. It is also referred to as banapple gas.

It was first documented in 1844 and came into medical use in 1867.

Uses
 Amyl nitrite is employed medically to treat heart diseases as well as angina. 
 Amyl nitrite is sometimes used as an antidote for cyanide poisoning. It can act as an oxidant, to induce the formation of methemoglobin. Methemoglobin in turn can sequester cyanide as cyanomethemoglobin.
 Amyl nitrite is used as a cleaning agent and solvent in industrial and household applications. It replaced dichlorodifluoromethane, an industrial chemical universally banned in 1996 due to damage to the ozone layer, as a printed circuit board cleaner. Trace amounts are added to some perfumes.
 It is also used recreationally as an inhalant drug that induces a brief euphoric state, and when combined with other intoxicant stimulant drugs such as cocaine or MDMA, the euphoric state intensifies and is prolonged. Once some stimulative drugs wear off, a common side effect is a period of depression or anxiety, colloquially called a "come down"; amyl nitrite is sometimes used to combat these negative after-effects.  This effect, combined with its dissociative effects, has led to its use as a recreational drug (see  poppers).

Nomenclature
The term "amyl nitrite" encompasses several isomers. In older literature, the common non-systematic name amyl was often used for the pentyl group, where the amyl group is a linear or normal (n) alkyl group, and the resulting amyl nitrite would have the structural formula CH3(CH2)4ONO, also referred to as n-amyl nitrite.

A common form of amyl nitrite is the isomer with the formula (CH3)2CHCH2CH2ONO, which may be more specifically referred to as isoamyl nitrite.

The similarly named amyl nitrate has very different properties. At the same time, isopropyl nitrite has a similar structure and similar uses (also called 'poppers') but with worse side-effects.

Synthesis and reactions
Alkyl nitrites are prepared by the reaction of alcohols with nitrous acid:

ROH  +  HONO  →  RONO  +  H2O, where R = alkyl group

The reaction is called esterification. Synthesis of alkyl nitrites is, in general, straightforward and can be accomplished in home laboratories. A common procedure includes the dropwise addition of concentrated sulfuric acid to a cooled mixture of an aqueous sodium nitrite solution and an alcohol. The intermediately-formed stoichiometric mixture of nitrogen dioxide and nitric oxide then converts the alcohol to the alkyl nitrite, which, due to its low density, will form an upper layer that can be easily decanted from the reaction mixture.

Isoamyl nitrite decomposes in the presence of base to give nitrite salts and the isoamyl alcohol:
C5H11ONO  +  NaOH  → C5H11OH  +  NaNO2

Amyl nitrite, like other alkyl nitrites, reacts with carbanions to give oximes.

Amyl nitrites are also useful as reagents in a modification of the Sandmeyer reaction.  The reaction of the alkyl nitrite with an aromatic amine in a halogenated solvent produces a radical aromatic species, this then frees a halogen atom from the solvent.  For the synthesis of aryl iodides diiodomethane is used, whereas bromoform is the solvent of choice for the synthesis of aryl bromides.

Physiological effects

Amyl nitrite, in common with other alkyl nitrites, is a potent vasodilator; it expands blood vessels, resulting in lowering of the blood pressure. Amyl nitrite may be used during cardiovascular stress testing in patients with suspected hypertrophic cardiomyopathy to cause vasodilation and thereby reduce afterload and provoke obstruction of blood flow towards the aorta from the ventricle by increasing the pressure gradient, thereby causing left ventricular outflow obstruction. Alkyl nitrites are a source of nitric oxide, which signals for relaxation of the involuntary muscles. Physical effects include decrease in blood pressure, headache, flushing of the face, increased heart rate, dizziness, and relaxation of involuntary muscles, especially the blood vessel walls and the internal and external anal sphincter. There are no withdrawal symptoms. Overdose symptoms include nausea, vomiting, hypotension, hypoventilation, shortness of breath, and fainting. The effects set in very quickly, typically within a few seconds and disappear within a few minutes.  Amyl nitrite may also intensify the experience of synesthesia. Amyl nitrite, when given as a medication for patients with angina can also be administered as an ampule. The ampule is put in a gauze pad and then inhaled by the patient during an angina attack and repeated every fifteen minutes. However, oral dosing of amyl nitrite is ineffective due to poor absorption and extensive hepatic metabolism.  Amyl nitrite has been widely replaced by nitroglycerin for the treatment of acute angina.

Toxicity 
Although there are case reports of life-threatening toxicity involving unusually large amounts, typical inhaled doses of amyl nitrite are considered relatively safe. However, liquid amyl nitrite is highly toxic when ingested because of the unsafely high concentration it effects in blood. Regardless of the form or route of administration, acute toxicity principally results when the nitrite oxidizes a significant proportion of hemoglobin in the blood without oxygen, forming methemoglobin, which cannot carry oxygen. Severe poisoning cases will progress to methemoglobinemia, characterized by a blue-brown discoloration under the skin which could be mistaken for cyanosis. Treatment with oxygen and intravenous methylene blue frustrates visual confirmation further as methylene blue itself is, as its name suggests, a blue dye; the patient's changes in different shades of blue notwithstanding, it is an effective antidote by way of catalyzing the production of the enzyme responsible for reducing the methemoglobin in the blood back to hemoglobin.

The discoloration does mean that regular near-infrared–based pulse oximetry becomes useless. More fundamentally, blood gas analysis on the whole has limited effectiveness, as the increased methemoglobin level increases the oxygen binding affinity of regular hemoglobin. Therefore, the measurement of actual ratios and levels of methemoglobin and hemoglobin must accompany any blood gas partial pressure sample in these cases.

References

Further reading 

  Editorial on the use of the word "amyl".

Antianginals
Antidotes
Alkyl nitrites
Muscle relaxants
Vasodilators